The 2nd Regional Command under the Vietnam People's Navy (VPN) is the Naval Operations Command that independently manages and protects the seas from South Bình Thuận to Bạc Liêu and the southern continental shelf, including the important area. The point is the sea with economic - scientific - service clusters (hereinafter referred to as DK1) on the southern continental shelf, including the southern provinces of Bình Thuận, Bà Rịa–Vũng Tàu, Ho Chi Minh City, Tiền Giang, Bến Tre, Trà Vinh, Sóc Trăng, Bạc Liêu, and the southeast sea of Cà Mau province (including DK1/10 rig house in Cà Mau shoal).

History 

 On March 19, 2009, the 2nd Navy Region (Vùng 2 Hải quân) was established under the Naval Service.
 On January 14, 2011, the Navy Region 2 Command (Bộ Chỉ huy Vùng 2 Hải quân) was upgraded to the 2nd Regional Command (Bộ Tư lệnh Vùng 2 Hải quân).

Current leadership 

 Commander: Colonel Nguyễn Anh Tuấn (former Deputy Chief of Staff of the Navy).
 Political Commissar: Rear Admiral Đỗ Văn Yên (former Political Director of 2nd Regional Command).
 Deputy Commander: Colonel Phạm Quyết Tiến (former Brigade commander of 167th Artillery - Missile Brigade - 2nd Regional Command).
 Deputy Commander: Colonel Lê Bá Quân (former Brigade commander of 167th Artillery - Missile Brigade - 2nd Regional Command).
 Deputy Commander: Colonel Đinh Văn Thắng.
 Deputy Political Commissar: Colonel Đặng Mạnh Hùng (former Political Commissar of 2nd Fisheries Control Division 2nd Regional Command).

Organisation 

 Advisory Department
 Political Department
 Logistics Department
 Technical Department
 Financial Committee
 171st Warship Brigade (formerly Fleet 171st, reduced to a brigade since 1981)
 125th Transport Brigade
 167th Artillery - Missile Brigade
 681st Coast Missile Brigade
 251st Radar Regiment
 2nd Guards Division
 DK1 Battalion
 67th Information Battalion
 Technical Assurance Center
 Regional Training Center

Commanders through the ages 

 -2014, Phạm Xuân Điệp, Rear Admiral (2012), Deputy Commander of the Navy (2014-present).
 2014 - July 2017, Lương Việt Hùng, Rear Admiral (2015), Deputy Commander of the Navy (July 7, 2017 - present)
 July 2017 - 2020, Phạm Khắc Lượng, Rear Admiral (2018), former Deputy Commander 2nd Region.
 2020 - now Nguyễn Anh Tuấn, Colonel.

Political Commissars through the ages 

 Mai Tiến Tuyên, Rear Admiral.
 2016-2019, Nguyễn Phong Cảnh, Rear Admiral.
 2019 - present, Đỗ Văn Yên, Rear Admiral.

See also 

 1st Regional Command
 3rd Regional Command
4th Regional Command
5th Regional Command

Notes 

Regional Command, Vietnam People's Navy